The 1989 Virginia Slims of California was a women's tennis tournament played on indoor carpet courts at the Oakland-Alameda County Coliseum Arena in Oakland, California in the United States and was part of Category 4 tier of the 1989 WTA Tour. The tournament ran from February 20 through February 26, 1989. Third-seeded Zina Garrison won the singles title.

Finals

Singles

 Zina Garrison defeated  Larisa Savchenko 6–1, 6–1
 It was Garrison's 2nd title of the year and the 19th of her career.

Doubles

 Patty Fendick /  Jill Hetherington defeated  Larisa Savchenko /  Natasha Zvereva 7–5, 3–6, 6–2
 It was Fendick's 3rd title of the year and the 11th of her career. It was Hetherington's 2nd title of the year and the 9th of her career.

External links
 Official website
 ITF tournament edition details
 Tournament draws

Virginia Slims of California
Silicon Valley Classic
Virginia Slims of California
Virginia Slims of California
Virginia Slims of California